Statistics of the Yemeni League in the 1999-00 season.

Results

Group 1

Group 2

Playoffs

Semifinals

First Legs
[Apr 21]
Al-Ahli Sana     1-1 Al-Wahda Sana
[Apr 22]
Al-Tali'aa Taizz    0-0 Sha'ab M

Second Legs [Apr 28]
Al-Wahda Sana    1-2 Al-Ahli Sana
Sha'ab M   1-2 Al-Tali'aa Taizz

Third-place match

First Leg [May 5]
Sha'ab M   1-0 Al-Wahda Sana

Second Leg [May 11]
Al-Wahda Sana    3-0 Sha'ab M

Championship final

First Leg [May 5]
Al-Tali'aa Taizz    2-1 Al-Ahli Sana

Second Leg [May 11]
Al-Ahli Sana    5-1 Al-Tali'aa Taizz

External links
 

Yem
Yemeni League seasons
football
football